is a district located in Fukuoka Prefecture, Japan.

As of 2003 statistics (but following the merger of Kitano), the district has an estimated population of 15,378 and a density of 674 persons per km2. The total area is 22.83 km2.

Towns and villages
Tachiarai

Mergers
On February 5, 2005 the former town of Kitano merged with three other towns (from other districts) into the city of Kurume.

Districts in Fukuoka Prefecture